Robert Józef Kubica (born 7 December 1984) is a Polish racing and rally driver. He was the first and, the only Polish racing driver to compete in Formula One. Between 2006 and 2009 he drove for the BMW Sauber F1 team, promoted from test driver to race driver during 2006. That season he led the championship at one stage, before finishing fourth overall, his best career position. Several years later Kubica confirmed he had signed a pre-contract for the  season with Ferrari, a move that was eventually cancelled by his devastating rally crash in early 2011.

On 6 February 2011, Kubica was seriously injured in a crash at the Ronde di Andora rally, in which his right forearm was partially severed. He was taking part to better his skills. Kubica told Italian newspaper La Gazzetta dello Sport in a bedside interview that he could feel the fingers in his right hand and was determined to make a swift return to Formula One in 2011. Since his return to good health, however, he initially stated that a return to Formula One would be "nearly impossible" because of his injury. Since then, he took part in tests with Renault and Williams, admitting that a Formula One return in the near future was not impossible.

Kubica returned to racing in September 2012, winning a minor rally in Italy. Kubica was named one of "The Men of the Year 2012" by Top Gear magazine for his return to auto racing. In 2013, he drove for Citroën in the European and World Rally-2 Championships. He went on to win the inaugural WRC-2 title, and moved to the WRC championship full-time in 2014, driving a Ford Fiesta RS WRC prepared by M-Sport.

On 16 January 2018, it was announced that Kubica would become the reserve driver of Williams for the 2018 season. On 22 November 2018, Kubica was announced as a Williams race driver for the 2019 Formula One season. He left the Williams team at the end of 2019, moving across to the Deutsche Tourenwagen Masters, while maintaining a Formula One presence as reserve and test driver for Alfa Romeo. He has made several appearances during practice sessions in his role as test driver, and he replaced Kimi Räikkönen at the Dutch and Italian Grands Prix in 2021.

Early years

Karting
Kubica developed his love for all kinds of cars at the young age of four when he spotted a small off-road vehicle, powered by a  petrol engine. After long talks with his parents, his father Artur bought him the car and young Kubica spent long hours driving around plastic bottles. When he got older it became apparent that he needed better equipment, so his father bought him a go-kart. However, Kubica was too young to start racing in the Polish Karting Championship as he was under the age of ten. When he entered the championship, he won six titles in three years. After his third season, Kubica decided to switch to a more competitive series in Italy. In 1998 Kubica became the first foreigner to win the International Italian Junior Karting Championship.

Kubica also scored second place in the European Junior Karting Championship and won the Junior Monaco Kart Cup held on part of the Formula One Grand Prix track. A year later, he defended his title in Italy and also competed in the International German Karting Championship. He also won the Monaco Kart Cup for the second time in a row, as well as the Margutti Trophy and Elf Masters races. In 2000, his last season in karting, Kubica scored fourth places in both the European and World Championships.

Junior formulae

Kubica started his professional career in 2000, as a test driver for a Formula Renault 2000 car. During his first professional season in Formula Renault, Kubica scored his maiden pole position and also became a member of Renault's driver development programme. In 2002 Kubica won four races and scored a second place in the Italian Formula Renault 2000. He was also seventh in the Formula Renault Eurocup. At the end of the year he took part in a Brazilian Formula Renault 2000 race held at the Interlagos circuit. This one-off appearance resulted in a dominant win.

After Formula Renault, Kubica moved to the Formula 3 Euro Series. However, his move was delayed by a road accident which left him with a broken arm, and titanium screws holding it together. At his delayed debut at Norisring, Kubica, driving with a plastic brace and 18 titanium bolts in his arm, won the race. He finished the season in 12th place. At the end of the year, Kubica won a street race in Sardinia and came fifth in races held in Macau and Korea. He ended his second season in the Formula 3 Euro Series, spent with the factory Mercedes team, in 7th position. In November 2004, he scored pole position in the Macau F3 Grand Prix, where he broke the lap record, but finished second in the race.

In 2005 he won the World Series by Renault championship with the Epsilon Euskadi team, earning Formula One tests with Renault.

Formula One career

BMW Sauber

2006 season: first Polish F1 driver
In , Kubica became the official reserve driver for the BMW Sauber Formula One team. Kubica qualified ninth, beating his more experienced teammate Nick Heidfeld. In the race, he finished in seventh place, but was disqualified after the race for having an underweight car. Villeneuve decided to leave the BMW Sauber team soon after the race, and Kubica's position in the team for the remainder of the season was confirmed by BMW.

Heidfeld, who was delayed in a first-corner accident, placed behind Kubica.

In China, he finished 13th, again after a mistake in tyre choice. After going off track at the first turn of the race, he moved from 17th position to fifth, before pitting. He was the first to change from intermediate tyres to dry tyres after the wet track started to dry. This decision was made too early: a very slow next lap in extremely wet and slippery conditions and another pit stop to change back to intermediates cost him his place in the points.

2007 season: an injury-plagued year

Kubica performed well during the 2007 season, finishing consistently in point scoring positions. At the  Kubica had a serious crash approaching the hairpin on lap 27, in which his car made contact with Jarno Trulli's Toyota, and hit a hump in the grass which lifted the car's nose into the air and left him unable to brake or steer. The car then hit the concrete retaining wall and rolled as it came back across the track, striking the opposite wall on the outside of the hairpin and coming to rest on its side. The car was heavily damaged and Kubica's feet could be seen exposed through the destroyed nose of the car. After data from the onboard accident data recorder had been analysed it was found that he had been subjected to a peak G-force of 75 G. Under safety car conditions, Kubica was removed from the car and taken to the circuit's medical centre, where he was announced to be in "stable" condition. Shortly afterwards, his manager Daniele Morelli said Kubica was conscious and talking. It was initially reported that Kubica could have a broken leg. However, Mario Theissen later confirmed that he was not seriously injured.

Further reports from late evening on race day, directly from the hospital, confirmed that Kubica had suffered a light concussion alongside a sprained ankle. After being kept in overnight for observation, Kubica left hospital the following day. After missing Indianapolis, he returned for the  where he qualified and finished in fourth place, receiving ITV broadcaster Martin Brundle's driver of the day award.

2008 season

He started second on the grid and passed race leader Lewis Hamilton in the first round of pitstops after the BMW Sauber pit crew completed a faster pitstop. On leaving the pits, Kubica and Kimi Räikkönen's Ferrari halted at the pit lane exit, waiting for the red pit exit light to change. Hamilton, running immediately behind them, missed the light and crashed into Räikkönen's Ferrari, eliminating both cars from the race. Kubica rejoined the race well positioned for the eventual victory. He passed Heidfeld's sister BMW Sauber, running one refuelling stop to Kubica's two stop strategy, and gained the necessary 24 seconds over Heidfeld to ensure that he maintained the lead after his second stop 22 laps later. The BMW Saubers remained first and second to the end of the race. Kubica later joked that he should thank Hamilton for electing to crash into Räikkönen instead of him. The win gave Kubica the lead in the Drivers' Championship.

BMW Sauber's results were weaker over the second half of the season. Kubica's strongest result of the latter part of the year was in Japan where he qualified sixth. At the start, several drivers braked too late for the first corner. Kubica took an inside line overtaking several cars and emerged in the lead. He led for 16 laps, but lost his lead to Fernando Alonso at the first round of pit stops. Kubica finished second after defending his position towards the end of the race against Räikkönen in a faster Ferrari (his fastest race lap was 0.6 seconds quicker than the Pole's) Apart from that, Kubica achieved podiums in a race in Valencia and in the rain affected race at Monza. Kubica finished the year fourth in the Drivers' Championship.

2009 season: final year with BMW

At the  season opener in Melbourne, Kubica qualified fourth on the grid. During the race, he was in third place and closing the gap to the front two cars before making contact with Sebastian Vettel while trying to overtake him. After the incident, Kubica continued briefly, but crashed into a wall at the next corner because his front wing had become stuck under the car. Vettel was later deemed responsible for the accident, and given a 10-place penalty on the grid for the next race in Malaysia.

BMW motorsport director Mario Theissen claimed that Kubica would have won the race ahead of Jenson Button had it not been for Vettel.

However, he retired very early in the race with engine problems.

For the next race in Barcelona, BMW Sauber prepared a modified version of the F1.09. The car proved more competitive but a mistake in fitting the tyres to Kubica's car during Q3 meant he could only qualify in 10th position. In the race, after a bad start (due to a clutch issue) he finished once more out of the points. Kubica had an engine failure during second practice in Monaco, and retired from the Grand Prix due to a brake issue. The car's performance improved and Kubica managed to score his first points of the season with a 7th place. In the next 3 races both BMW Sauber drivers finished outside the points again, but during the European and Belgian Grands Prix again proved to be competitive, scoring 8th and 4th positions respectively. In Italy, Kubica had engine trouble in qualifying and then retired from the race due to an oil leak. He later stated it was "the most difficult point I have ever scored". The podium was BMW's second of the season.

On 29 July 2009, BMW announced that they would leave Formula One at the end of 2009, which made Kubica a free agent for the  season. For the 2010 season, it was announced that he had signed for Renault F1, the team he tested for during his junior career.

Renault

2010 season: moving to Renault

His position was briefly put in doubt, however, by the team evaluating its future in the sport following the 2009 season in the wake of the "Crashgate" scandal and the parent company's financial problems. This resulted in a Luxembourg-based investment firm, Genii Capital, taking a 75% stake in the team; Renault retained the remaining 25%. Eric Boullier was also appointed as the new team manager. Kubica said he might not stay with Renault, as his contract was only valid if the parent company had a controlling stake in the team, but he then decided to remain with them. On 31 January 2010, it was announced that Vitaly Petrov was to be Kubica's teammate.

However, Ferrari re-signed Massa for 2011, leaving Kubica without a drive at the Italian team.

On 7 July 2010, it was confirmed that Kubica had extended his contract with Renault to 2012.

At the opening race of the  season in Bahrain, Kubica was tagged by Adrian Sutil and spun on the opening lap but recovered to 11th. At the next race in Australia, he finished second after starting in ninth position. Fourth in Malaysia and fifth in China left him in seventh place in the Drivers' Championship, 20 points behind championship leader Jenson Button. Kubica felt that had there not been a second safety car period in China he could have finished on the podium. In Spain he finished eighth, but followed this up with another podium in Monaco, holding third throughout after losing second at the start to Sebastian Vettel.

In Canada, Kubica finished seventh after an eventful race and problems with tyre degradation which made his race difficult, but did set the first fastest lap of his career in the race's closing stages. He added a fifth in Valencia and seventh in Germany before taking his third podium of the season in Belgium. He was competitive throughout the weekend, qualifying third, and only a bungled pitstop cost him second to Mark Webber. In Singapore, he qualified eighth in front of Schumacher. During the late stages of the race, he was forced to pit from sixth place due to a puncture. He was released from the pits to twelfth place, but with the help from superior grip and a series of overtaking moves—his move against Sutil was favourably compared to the incident between Webber and Hamilton—was able to claim seventh place, ultimately gaining a place from his qualifying result. In Suzuka, he managed to trail the Red Bulls throughout the weekend and translated it into a strong third place in qualifying. However, despite getting a good start and overtaking Webber at the start of the race, but would retire during the safety car period after losing one of his rear tyres.

Formula One journalist Mark Hughes remarked that Kubica was currently "arguably the best driver", considering the season so far. He emphasised Kubica's strong showing in tracks where Hughes believed that the differences in driver skills are able to overwhelm the differences in the capability of the cars; namely, Monaco, Spa and Suzuka. Kubica managed to finish on the podium behind the Red Bulls except in Suzuka where he was strong throughout the weekend nevertheless, despite retiring from the race through no fault of his own.

2011 season: near-fatal crash ends season

Kubica was retained by Renault – rebranded as Lotus Renault GP through Lotus Cars sponsorship – into the  season, again partnered with Petrov. He tested the team's new car, the Renault R31, for the first time in Valencia on 2 February. On the last day of testing in Valencia he set the fastest time of the session.

On 6 February 2011, Kubica was injured in a crash on the first stage of the Ronde di Andora rally. He was driving a Super 2000-specification Škoda Fabia in Testico when his car left the road at high speed and hit a crash barrier, near the church of San Sebastiano. Kubica was trapped in the car for more than an hour before rescue workers were able to extricate him. He was flown by helicopter to Santa Corona Hospital in Pietra Ligure near Savona, where it was confirmed that he had a partial amputation of his forearm, compound fractures to his right elbow, shoulder and leg, as well as significant loss of blood. The severity of his injuries was the result of the crash barrier penetrating the car's cockpit, and hitting Kubica, while leaving his co-driver unscathed. Kubica underwent a seven-hour operation by seven doctors split into two teams, without complications. Two more lengthy operations to repair fractures to his leg, shoulder and arm were performed successfully a few days later. The condition of his hand was not clear for some time and as a result he missed the 2011 season. As he was unable to start the season, Lotus Renault signed his former BMW Sauber teammate Nick Heidfeld as his replacement on 16 February, while Kubica still remained signed with the team for the 2011 season. Kubica was released from hospital to begin his rehabilitation on 24 April 2011. In November 2011 it was announced that Kubica would not be ready for the beginning of the  season, forcing Renault (who at which point had changed their name to Lotus) to begin the season with two other drivers, Kimi Räikkönen and Romain Grosjean. In an interview in 2018 Kubica revealed that he had signed for Ferrari for the  season.

After the accident

Return to motorsport

Rally racing
Kubica's recovery was dealt another setback after he re-broke his right leg, when he reportedly slipped on ice near his home in Italy, on 11 January 2012. He remained out of competitive racing for most of 2012, but returned to compete in the Ronde Gomitolo Di Lana in a WRC car on 9 September. He won the rally, finishing one minute ahead of the second placed driver.
In 2013, Kubica continued his return, focusing on rallying. He drove for Citroën in the European and World Rally-2 Championships. His first event was the Rally de Portugal, in which he was competitive, but crashed and issues with his car led to him finishing in 6th. Then, at the Acropolis Rally, Kubica won, finishing nearly 90 seconds ahead of second placed Yuriy Protasov. He repeated this success at the Rally d'Italia winning ahead of Abdulaziz Al-Kuwari by 4 minutes. At the 2013 Rally Finland Kubica lost to Jari Ketomaa by nearly 90 seconds. The Rallye Deutschland was a big success. Not only did the Pole win ahead of Elfyn Evans by 12.9 seconds, he became the leader of the World Rally-2 Championships. He re-gained this position (Al-Kuwari became the leader in Australia) at the Rallye de France, again beating Evans, this time by 4 minutes. He won again at the Rally RACC Catalunya, his fifth victory of the season. With this result he was able to clinch the championship, as his nearest rival Al-Kuwari was too far behind to regain the first position in the championship. Kubica conducted a number of simulator tests with the Mercedes Formula 1 team which showed promise, but limitations in the range of motion of his injured arm would prevent him from driving in twisty circuits like Monaco due to the tight confines of an F1 cockpit.

In 2014, Kubica started in the first round of the ERC season. He won the Internationale Jänner Rallye to claim his first victory in that championship, after coming very close on a number of occasions in 2014. His strong results in the stages for this rally eventually netted him the "Ice Master" trophy for the best driver in snow events that season. For the rest of the season, he participated in the main WRC class for the RK M-Sport, running as separate team, backed by Polish oil company Lotos. Kubica began his WRC campaign by taking the lead of the Monte Carlo Rally through the first two stages, but later retired on the second day after crashing out on SS9. Kubica suffered from a string of bad luck for the rest of the season, being fast on occasion but rarely managing to convert his speed into results. His best result was a 6th place at the Rally Argentina, a place lower than his highest finish in 2013 (5th in Germany) in a WRC-2 car. He finished the season in 16th place with 14 points. He finished the year on a positive note by winning the non-championship Monza Rally Show, beating motorcycle legend Valentino Rossi to second.

After speculation following the 2014 WRC season, Kubica announced he would be racing in 2015, still running Ford Fiesta RS WRC and backed by Lotos, albeit no longer prepared by M-Sport. In 2016 due to a lack of funding his sole WRC rally was the Monte Carlo.

GT3
In March 2016 he took part in the Mugello 12 Hours, a round of Creventic's International Endurance Series, in a GT3 Mercedes. In September 2016 he competed in the Renault Sport Trophy at the penultimate round of the season in Spa, Belgium.

In January 2017, he took part in the first round of the 24H Series, the Dubai 24 Hour, driving a Förch Racing Porsche 911 GT3 in the A6-Pro class with co-drivers Robert Lukas, Marcin Jedliński, Wolf Henzler and Santiago Creel. This ended in retirement with undisclosed mechanical problems.

LMP1
On 2 February 2017, Kubica was signed by the ByKolles privateer LMP1 team in the FIA World Endurance Championship. This came after he tested their car in November 2016 during the WEC rookie test at Bahrain, and lapped faster than the team's regulars managed on the race weekend. Oliver Webb will remain with the team, with a third driver for the Nissan-powered CLM P1/01 yet to be named. After the pre-season testing at Italy's Autodromo Nazionale Monza, where Kubica did not do any running, the driver announced via social media that he would not be participating in the forthcoming season.

Formula E
On 2 May 2017, Kubica partook in an independently organised test of a Formula E car at Donington Park, with an aim of partaking in the New York ePrix. This failed to happen.

Returning to Formula One

2017: uncontracted testing
On 5 June 2017, it was announced that Kubica would be driving in a Renault-organized test of their 2012 car, the Lotus E20, at Circuit Ricardo Tormo, his first Formula One event since his accident in 2011.

Renault organised a further test, with Renault managing director Cyril Abiteboul stating that "he was still quick, still consistent and more importantly he still has the enthusiasm he always carried to the team". He added that there were "no obvious roadblocks" to a Formula One return, and told NBC Sports that Kubica could be an option for 2018.

On 24 July 2017, it was announced that Kubica would participate in the test for Renault, which would be held after the conclusion of the Hungarian Grand Prix. Abiteboul, Renault's team managing director, said the test will allow the team to fully assess Kubica's current capabilities, and how likely he might be to "return to competition in the upcoming years". Kubica completed 142 laps of the Hungaroring on his return, finishing fourth-fastest nearly 1.5 seconds behind Sebastian Vettel.

On 11 October 2017, Kubica completed a one-day test with Williams at Silverstone driving the 2014 FW36. On 17 October 2017, Kubica had a second day of testing with Williams at the Hungaroring.

After Felipe Massa announced his retirement from the sport for the second time, Kubica became one of the top contenders to take his seat at Williams Martini Racing. He then tested for them at the Yas Marina Circuit following the 2017 Abu Dhabi Grand Prix, completing 100 laps in his first test with the team's 2017 FW40. He completed an additional 28 laps the next day and finished seventh fastest, with Williams technical chief Paddy Lowe reporting that "there are no issues around" his injuries, though doubts soon emerged about whether certain factors had made the times look better.

Williams

2018 season: reserve driver for Williams

On 16 January 2018, it was announced that Kubica would become the reserve driver of Williams for the 2018 season. He took part in his first Grand Prix weekend since the final round of the 2010 campaign, in Friday's first practice session at the 2018 Spanish Grand Prix, outperforming teammate Lance Stroll.

2019 season: full-time racing seat

Before the final round of the 2018 season, Williams announced that Kubica would race full-time for the team in 2019, partnering 2018 Formula 2 champion George Russell. Kubica chose 88 as his driver number, previously used by Rio Haryanto in 2016.
The team struggled during the season, with the FW42 being the slowest car of the field. Kubica finished in 12th place at the German Grand Prix, however was promoted to 10th following penalties for Kimi Räikkönen and Antonio Giovinazzi, scoring his first point since his return to F1 and breaking the record of the longest time between successive points finishes.

On 19 September 2019, before the Singapore Grand Prix, Kubica announced his decision to end his stint at Williams after the end of the season. Williams released a statement shortly after, stating that Kubica would see out the remainder of the season but would vacate his driver position for the 2020 season.

Kubica's first retirement since his return to the sport came in Russia, when Williams decided to retire his car to conserve parts after teammate Russell's race ended due to a wheel nut issue. Williams were criticised for the decision, particularly by Kubica's personal sponsors PKN Orlen. At the following race in Japan, Kubica criticised the team's decision to remove an upgraded front wing from his car for the race, after he had trialled it during practice sessions.

At the 2019 Brazilian Grand Prix, Kubica's Williams mechanics released him from his pit box too early, narrowly avoiding hitting Max Verstappen and holding him up in the pit lane.

Kubica ended a difficult season in 19th place in the championship with 1 point, finishing ahead of rookie teammate Russell in the standings. He decided to leave the team and was replaced by 2019 Formula 2 runner-up Nicholas Latifi.

Alfa Romeo Racing

2020 season: Alfa Romeo reserve driver

He competed at the pre-season test at the Circuit de Barcelona-Catalunya and set the fastest laptime during the fourth day of testing. He was joined by 2019 F2 Championship driver Tatiana Calderón. During the season, Kubica completed tests at the Styrian, Hungarian, 70th Anniversary, Bahrain and Abu Dhabi Grands Prix. He also participated in the season-ending Abu Dhabi Young Drivers Test.

2021 season: Free practice sessions and stand-in appearance 
Full-time Alfa Romeo driver Kimi Räikkönen tested positive for COVID-19 on the weekend of the Dutch Grand Prix, with Kubica replacing him. He went on to qualify 18th and finish the race in 15th, while his teammate Antonio Giovinazzi dropped from 7th to 14th. Kubica also deputised for Räikkönen in the Italian Grand Prix at Monza. After qualifying 19th, and finishing the sprint qualifying in 18th after making contact with Yuki Tsunoda on the opening lap, he  eventually went on to finish the Grand Prix in 14th.

Prior to the two races in which he participated, Kubica drove in three free practice sessions in 2021 at the Spanish, Styrian and Hungarian Grands Prix, in addition to two days of Pirelli tyre testing for the 18-inch tyres.

2022 season: More free practice sessions 
For 2022, Kubica remained as a reserve and test driver. He took part in free practice for the Spanish, French, Hungarian and Abu Dhabi Grand Prix.

Alfa Romeo's main sponsor Orlen moved to Scuderia AlphaTauri for the 2023 F1 season, and Kubica left the team which could spell the end of his rollercoaster F1 career.

Racing record

Career summary

 As Kubica was a guest driver, he was ineligible to score points.
‡ Points only counted towards the Michelin Endurance Cup, and not the overall LMP2 Championship.
* Season still in progress.

Complete Formula 3 Euro Series results
(key) (Races in bold indicate pole position) (Races in italics indicate fastest lap)

Complete Formula Renault 3.5 Series results
(key) (Races in bold indicate pole position) (Races in italics indicate fastest lap)

Complete Formula One results
(key) (Races in bold indicate pole position) (Races in italics indicate fastest lap)

 Did not finish, but was classified as he had completed more than 90% of the race distance.

Complete World Rally Championship results

Complete World Rally Championship-2 results

Complete European Rally Championship results

Complete Deutsche Tourenwagen Masters results
(key) (Races in bold indicate pole position; races in italics indicate fastest lap)

Complete IMSA SportsCar Championship results
(key) (Races in bold indicate pole position; races in italics indicate fastest lap)

† Points only counted towards the Michelin Endurance Cup, and not the overall LMP2 Championship.

Complete European Le Mans Series results
(key) (Races in bold indicate pole position; results in italics indicate fastest lap)

Complete 24 Hours of Le Mans results

Complete FIA World Endurance Championship results
(key) (Races in bold indicate pole position) (Races in italics indicate fastest lap)

* Season still in progress.

See also
 Sport in Poland
 List of Poles

Footnotes

References

All Formula One race and championship results are taken from:
 Official Formula 1 Website. Archive: Results for 2006 – Present seasons Formula1.com. Retrieved 22 August 2006

External links

  
 Career details
 Kubica statistics in Formula One
 
 Pictures of his rally car after the 2011 crash

1984 births
Living people
Formula Renault Eurocup drivers
Formula 3 Euro Series drivers
World Series Formula V8 3.5 drivers
Intercontinental Rally Challenge drivers
Italian Formula Renault 2.0 drivers
Karting World Championship drivers
Polish expatriates in Monaco
Polish Formula One drivers
Polish racing drivers
Polish rally drivers
Renault Formula One drivers
Sauber Formula One drivers
Williams Formula One drivers
Formula One race winners
Sportspeople from Kraków
World Rally Championship drivers
European Rally Championship drivers
24 Hours of Daytona drivers
24H Series drivers
Brazilian Formula Renault 2.0 drivers
British Formula Three Championship drivers
Deutsche Tourenwagen Masters drivers
FIA World Endurance Championship drivers
24 Hours of Le Mans drivers
European Le Mans Series drivers
WeatherTech SportsCar Championship drivers
Alfa Romeo Formula One drivers
Carlin racing drivers
ART Grand Prix drivers
Prema Powerteam drivers
Mücke Motorsport drivers
Epsilon Euskadi drivers
Target Racing drivers
RC Motorsport drivers
Citroën Racing drivers
W Racing Team drivers
Manor Motorsport drivers
M-Sport drivers
Polish expatriates in Italy